The School of the Museum of Fine Arts at Tufts University (Museum School, SMFA at Tufts, or SMFA; formerly the School of the Museum of Fine Arts, Boston) is the art school of Tufts University, a private research university in Boston, Massachusetts. It offers undergraduate and graduate degrees dedicated to the visual arts. 

It is affiliated with the Museum of Fine Arts. SMFA is also a member of the Association of Independent Colleges of Art and Design (AICAD), a consortium of several dozen leading art schools in the United States. The school is accredited by the National Association of Schools of Art and Design.

History 
 
The school was founded in 1876 under the name School of the Museum of Fine Arts, Boston (SMFA). From 1876 to 1909, the school was housed in the basement of the original Museum building in Copley Square. When the Museum moved to Huntington Avenue in 1909, the School moved into a separate, temporary structure to the west of the main building. The permanent building, designed by Guy Lowell, was completed in 1927. The  red brick building provided improved classroom, studio and library facilities. 

In 1945 the Museum School and Tufts College collaborated to develop their first joint degree teacher training granting program. The creation of additional programs between the two institutions followed soon after.

In 1987, a newly renovated and expanded school building, designed by architect Graham Gund, more than doubled the size of the existing structure and provided an auditorium, enlarged library, expanded studios and classrooms, a spacious new entrance, cafeteria, and increased gallery and exhibition spaces. Gund's expansion included the central atrium, known as the Katherine Lane Weems Atrium, that connects the two buildings.

In December 2015, it was announced that the School of the Museum of Fine Arts, Boston would become a part of Tufts University and on June 30, 2016 the integration was completed.

With the late-2022 opening of the Green Line Extension of the MBTA Green Line E branch light rail transit route, there is a one-seat direct connection between the SMFA and the main campus of Tufts University in Medford.

Academics 
The school does not have a foundations program, but it does require all new students to take a freshman seminar. Encouraged to build an individual program of interdisciplinary study, students are not asked to declare a major, but by choosing among in-depth courses in a dozen disciplines, students are free to concentrate in a medium of their choice.

One of the unique attributes of SMFA is that students are required to participate in a "Review Board" which is a review of all of the art work that a student has done during the semester. Review Boards are led by two faculty members and two fellow students. There are many opportunities for students to exhibit their artwork at both the main building and the Mission Hill building.

Opportunities to exhibit works include the annual Art Sale and the juried "Student Annual Exhibition". Various galleries and spaces that are available to students around the school buildings include Bag Gallery, Hallway Gallery, Bathroom Gallery, Underground Gallery, as well as the Museum of Fine Arts, Boston.

The school's main campus is adjacent to and just to the west of the Museum of Fine Arts. Most classroom space is located there, as well as the Cafe des Arts, the library, the School's store, and the Grossman Gallery. The Mission Hill building, located about a quarter mile from the main building, recently has been renovated and includes studio spaces for graduate and post-baccalaureate students as well as classrooms, workshops, and the Writing Center.

W. Van Alan Clark, Jr. Library 
The Clark Library at SMFA is the fine arts branch of Tufts University's Tisch Library. According to its website, the Clark Library collection's contents focus heavily "on contemporary art and studio practice".

Notable alumni

Academia and administration 
 Alon Bement (diploma 1898), painter, arts administrator, author, and educator.
 Joseph Downs (1921), curator at the Metropolitan Museum of Art and Winterthur Museum

Business 
 Zach Feuer (BFA 2000), attended 1996–2000, art dealer.

Design 
 Tom Jung, attended in the 1930s, graphic designer and illustrator
 Sally Pierone, attended 1940–1942, art director and designer.

Film, video and animation

Illustrators and comic artists

Painters and printmakers

Performance artists

Photographers

Multimedia and installation artists 
 Anita Glesta (MFA degree), installation artist
 Laurel Nakadate (BFA 1998), film, video artist, and photographer.
 Ellen Levy (diploma 1981) is a multimedia artist and scholar who explores art, science, technology interrelationships and complex systems.

Musicians

Sculptors

Writers 
Susan Howe (diploma 1961) poet, scholar, essayist and critic.
Lawrence Park, attended 1896–1897, art historian, architect, and genealogist
Rebecca Richardson Joslin, author, lecturer, benefactor, clubwoman

Notable faculty

Sculptor faculty 
 Frederick Warren Allen, sculptor, taught for almost 50 years (1907–1954) and for 30 years he was the Head of the Sculpture Department. Emeritus.
 Frank Dengler, sculptor, faculty for a short time, until 1877.
 Charles Grafly, sculptor, he served as the Head of Modeling from 1917–1929.
 Bela Lyon Pratt, sculptor, she served as the Head of Modeling from 1893–1917.

Painting faculty 
 David Aronson, painter, sculptor; Emeritus Professor of Art, Boston University.
 Ture Bengtz (diploma 1933), Boston Expressionist school painter, later a teacher at School of the Museum of Fine Arts.
David Antonio Cruz, painter and interdisciplinary artist; faculty.
 Esther Geller, attended 1921, abstract expressionist painter, known for encaustic painting, taught with Karl Zerbe from 1943–1944.
Philip Leslie Hale, attended 1883, later served as faculty from 1893–1931, painter.
 Arnold Borisovich Lakhovsky, painter, taught painting starting in 1935.
William McGregor Paxton, painter and a co-founder of The Guild of Boston Artists. He was faculty from 1906–1913.
 Karl Zerbe, German-American painter, he served as the Head of Department of Painting from 1937–1955.

Drawing faculty 
 Ethan Murrow, drawing and site-specific projects.

Other faculty 
 Chantal Zakari, faculty, book artist and graphic designer.

See also
 Bad Girrls Studios
Cowles Art School
Boston Expressionism
 Boston School (painting)

References

External links 

Universities and colleges in Boston
Art schools in Massachusetts
Museum of Fine Arts, Boston
Cultural history of Boston
Educational institutions established in 1876
1876 establishments in Massachusetts
 
Boston expressionism